Shadowman is a 1997 studio album by Link Wray on Ace Records. The track "Rumble on the Docks" was used by Anheuser-Busch for a 2000 television advertising campaign.

Tracklist
Rumble On The Docks	
Heartbreak Hotel	
Geronimo	
Young Love	
Moped Baby	
Run Through The Jungle	
I Can't Help It (If I'm Still In Love With You)	
Night Prowler	
It Was So Easy	
Timewarp/Brain Damage	
Listen To The Drums	
Shadowman

References

1997 albums
Link Wray albums